The Saint Lucia Jazz and Arts Festival is an annual event on the Caribbean island of Saint Lucia that brings together local and international musicians and other performing artists, as well as artisans. The festival presents jazz, R&B, and Calypso music, dance, theatre, and international couture.

History

The first Saint Lucia Jazz Festival was held in 1992 as an initiative to extend the tourist season and increase foreign exchange in Saint Lucia into May which had previously been a relatively quiet period. It was inspired by the launching of the October Jazz Festival in 1991 spearheaded by Luther Francois as Musical Director. Originally 4 locations were used; however today the festival has expanded and several locations around the island are used to host performances (see list below). At first, the festival attendances were small. But as the years passed, word spread helped by coverage on the BET J television network, and it is now a well-established fixture on the Jazz festival calendar.

In 2011 the Saint Lucia Jazz Festival celebrated its 20th anniversary, a rare achievement, as several other Jazz festivals established in the Caribbean region had failed. In 2013 the festival was rebranded as the Saint Lucia Jazz and Arts Festival. The rebranding included a fashion show branded as Saint Lucia HOT Couture, the Cultural Explosion, Saint Lucia Sound Stage, and Blu Session - Word in an Altered Scale. Dance, art, theatre and culinary arts formed part of the new rebranding experience.

Performers have included George Benson, Mary J. Blige, Boyz II Men, Ciara, En Vogue, Herbie Hancock, Lauryn Hill, India.Arie, The Isley Brothers, Elton John, R. Kelly, Ladysmith Black Mambazo, John Legend, Mario, Branford Marsalis, Ne-Yo, Ocacia, Courtney Pine, Rihanna, Smokey Robinson, Santana, Trey Songz, Angie Stone, UB40, Luther Vandross, Amy Winehouse, American Idol winner Fantasia Barrino, and Malcolm-Jamal Warner. The event is ranked second in the Caribbean after the Trinidad Carnival.

Locations
Venues used to host performances include Pigeon Point National Park ("Main Stage" & "Side Lawn"), Derek Walcott Square in central Castries ("Jazz on the Square"), The Great House, Fond D'or Heritage Park, Rudy John Beach Park, Vieux Fort Square, Balenbouche Estate, (the previous three events making up "Jazz in the South"), Soufrière Waterfront, La Place Carenage ("Teatime Jazz"), Duty Free Pointe Seraphine ("Jazz on the Pier"), Rodney Bay Beachfront ("Jazz on the Beach"), Mindoo Phillip Park, Royal Saint Lucian Hotel, Fire Grill (Jazz on the Grill), Rodney Bay Marina and Gaiety on Rodney Bay.

Past performers

 Acoustic Alchemy
 Yolanda Adams
 Gerald Albright
 Ashanti
 Babyface
 Harry Belafonte
 Terence Blanchard
 Mary J. Blige
 Boyz II Men
 Norman Brown
 James Carter
 Ciara
 Stanley Clarke
 Natalie Cole
 Nicole David
 En Vogue
 Rachelle Ferrell
 Bunji Garlin
 Al Green
 Johnny Griffin
 Beres Hammond
 Herbie Hancock
 Morgan Heritage
 Ronald "Boo" Hinkson
 Los Hombres Calientes
 Shirley Horn
 Isley Brothers
 Freddie Jackson
 The Jacksons
 Joe
 Montell Jordan
 Kassav
 Chaka Khan
 Gladys Knight
 Kool & The Gang
 John Legend
 Gerald Levert
 Damian Jr. Gong Marley
 Brian McKnight
 Machel Montano
 New Edition
 Jeffrey Osborne
 Paul Peress
 Rihanna
 Smokey Robinson
 Diana Ross
 Rupee
 Seal
 Square One
 Angie Stone
 T.O.K.
 Third World
 UB40
 Luther Vandross
 Amy Winehouse
 Tito Puente 
 Earl Klugh

References

External links
 Official site

Jazz Festival
Jazz festivals in Saint Lucia
Recurring events established in 1991